Croton may refer to:

Biology
Crotoneae, a tribe of the flowering plant subfamily Crotonoideae
Croton (plant), a plant genus of the family Euphorbiaceae
Croton capitatus, also known as the woolly croton
Croton hancei, a species of Croton endemic to Hong Kong
Caperonia, a genus of plants of the family Euphorbiaceae commonly known as "false croton"
Codiaeum variegatum, an ornamental plant formerly classified in the genus Croton, and commonly called "croton"
 German cockroach (Blattella germanica), known as the Croton bug

Places

In Italy
 Crotone, ancient Kroton, a city in Calabria
 Crotone Airport, an airport serving the above city
 Province of Crotone, a province in Calabria

In the United States

In New York
Croton-on-Hudson, New York, a village in Westchester County
Croton–Harmon (Metro-North station)
Croton North Railroad Station
Croton Point, a peninsula in the Hudson River
Croton Falls, a hamlet in North Salem, New York
Croton Falls (Metro-North station)
New Croton reservoir, in Westchester County
New Croton Dam, the dam creating the above reservoir
New Croton aqueduct, a water distribution system constructed for New York City
Old Croton Aqueduct, a water distribution system constructed for New York City which was replaced by the above aqueduct
Old Croton Trail, following the path of the Old Croton Aqueduct
Old Croton Dam, a historic dam that the above dam has replaced
Croton Gorge Park, in Westchester County
Croton River, a tributary of the Hudson River
Croton Falls Reservoir, in Putnam County
Croton Expressway, a freeway in Westchester County

Elsewhere
 Croton Dam (Michigan), on the Muskegon River
 Croton Township, Michigan, in Newaygo County
 Croton, New Jersey
 Hartford, Ohio, a village whose post office is named Croton, Ohio
 Croton Creek, in Texas

Other uses
Croton oil (Crotonis Oleum), an oil prepared from the seeds of Croton tiglium
Crotonaldehyde, or 2-butenal, an unsaturated aldehyde
Crotonic acid, trans-2-butenoic acid,
Battle of Crotona, 204 BC
F.C. Crotone, a football club based in Crotone, Italy

See also
Crotone (fungus), a genus of fungus in the family Venturiaceae
Crouton, a small piece of toasted bread
Groton (disambiguation)
Kroton (disambiguation)